Altuğ Tanrıverdi Çinici (born Altuğ Tanrıverdi, 1935 in Istanbul) is an architect and graduate of the Istanbul Technical University Faculty of Architecture, where she received her degree in 1959. She collaborated on many architectural projects with her colleague and husband Behruz Çinici, with whom she cofounded Çinici Architectural Office (renamed Çinici Architects in 1963).

Among her most notable commissions are the public relations building of the Turkish Parliament Quarter, and the Middle East Technical University Campus. The latter commission was received when the Çinici proposal, designed and submitted by Altuğ and Behruz, was awarded first place by the project jury. Behruz framed their approach to the METU campus design as a challenge to the International Style of architecture that dominated architectural theory, education and culture. Rather than fit the landscape to the Çinici design, the Çinici proposal was the product of intensive site visits. After the construction of the METU campus, the Çinici firm continued with projects that included state commissions and other educational facilities. As a result, the firm was the recipient of multiple domestic and international awards, including the Simavi Foundation Award (1985), Is Bank Award (1994), Aga Khan Award for the Mosque of the Grand National Assembly (1995), and the Architect Sinan Award (2004).

The archive of Çinici Architects, formerly retained within the firm's architectural office in Istanbul, is in the process of transference to SALT (institution).

References

1935 births
Living people
Istanbul Technical University alumni
Architects  from Istanbul